Civic Network (Rete Civica, RC) is a left-wing political party active in Aosta Valley, Italy.

The party was formed in January 2019 upon the break-up of Civic Commitment (IC), an alike grouping which had obtained 7.5% of the vote and three regional councillors. Two of them, Alberto Bertin (a former member of Autonomy Liberty Participation Ecology) and Chiara Minelli, departed from IC and launched RC.

In June 2019, when the regional government led by Antonio Fosson of For Our Valley was in crisis, RC became part of the governing majority.

In the 2020 regional election the RC was part of a centre-left joint list, named Progressive Civic Project (PCP), comprising the Democratic Party (PD) and Green Europe (EV). The list obtained 15.7% of the vote and 7 seats, two of which for RC. After the election, a regionalist/centre-left government, composed of the Valdostan Union, the Valdostan Alliance, Edelweiss, Mouv', the PD and RC. Bertin was elected President of the Regional Council, while Minelli was appointed regional minister of the environment, transports and sustainable mobility.

Within a year, the RC-led PCP broke with the government and the PD: five councillors, including Bertin, sided with the PD and formed a new group named also "Progressive Federalists" in October 2021, while the remaining two, Erika Guichardaz and Minelli, who had resigned from regional minister in May, re-organised the PCP as the union of three groups — RC, EV and Democratic Area–Autonomist Left (AD–GA) —, and re-branded it as a left-wing opposition to the regionalist/centre-left government. Guichardaz was affiliated with AD–GA.

In the general election RC and PCP supported Guichardaz to the Chamber and Daria Pulz to the Senate, along with the Five Star Movement, AD–GA, Environment Rights Equality (ADU) and Italian Left, the latter two already united by a federative pact. Guichardaz and Pulz obtained 10.9% and 10.0% of the vote, respectively.

References

External links
Official website

2019 establishments in Italy
Political parties established in 2019
Political parties in Aosta Valley
Social democratic parties in Italy